The Maracucho Spanish (also called maracaibero, marabino or zuliano) is the variety of Spanish generally spoken in the Zulia state in the northwest of Venezuela and the west of the Falcón state (Mauroa Municipality). Unlike the dialects from Caracas or the Venezuelan Andean region, the maracucho is typically voseante. Preserves for this combination the shape of the second person plural familiar (vosotros), without apocope or syncope, which distinguishes it from the Chilean and Rioplatense voseo, respectively.

Besides, the maracucho is characterized by the use of many words and expressions different from the particular Spanish from Venezuela and an accent markedly different from those of other regions of the country. An interesting fact is that the demonyms of Maracaibo are due to the type of speech used by the people of Municipality. The maracuchos are characterized (in other states of Venezuela) for being foul-mouthed and sometimes cracked, but this depends on which part of the region they are in.

Also used are expressions such as "" and "", for example "" and the "" when something seems surprising them also to emphasize that if in the size, color, odor and other characteristics of what they refer to, example; "" or "" usually it is used by the maracaiberos as these expressions are seen as rude or vulgar.

References 

Spanish dialects of South America
Venezuelan culture
Languages of Venezuela
Zulia
Venezuelan Spanish